Jalan Sungai Putat (Malacca state route M126) is a major road in Malacca state, Malaysia. The road connects Batu Berendam to Ayer Keroh. It is also a shortcut road to North–South Expressway Southern Route via Ayer Keroh Interchange from Batu Berendam.

List of junctions

References

Roads in Malacca